Luuk Balkestein (born 9 April 1954 in Apeldoorn) is a Dutch retired football player who played for Sparta Rotterdam and Feyenoord, as well as the Dutch national side.

International career
Balkestein played three games for Netherlands U-21 and earned one senior cap for the Netherlands, a friendly match against France in March 1980.

Personal life
Balkestein is chief scout at German Bundesliga side Borussia Mönchengladbach and has been a scout at SC Heerenveen from 1995 to 2001.

His son, Pim, is also a footballer.

References

External links

 Player profile at Feyenoord Online
 Player profile at Weltfußball.de

1954 births
Living people
Sportspeople from Apeldoorn
Association football midfielders
Dutch footballers
Netherlands international footballers
Sparta Rotterdam players
Feyenoord players
SC Heerenveen non-playing staff
Borussia Mönchengladbach non-playing staff
Footballers from Gelderland